The Staatsphilharmonie Rheinland-Pfalz (State Philharmonic of Rhineland-Palatinate) is the largest and leading symphony orchestra of the German state of Rhineland-Palatinate, based in Ludwigshafen am Rhein. It gives concerts in Rhineland-Palatinate as well as across Germany and abroad. The orchestra was founded 1919 in Landau.

The orchestra includes 88 musicians from 16 nations as of the 2015/2016 season.

Conductors 
  (November 1919 – 1920)
  (1 November 1920 – 16 November 1938)
 Karl Friderich (1 April 1939 – 31 March 1943)
 Franz Konwitschny (1943/44)
 Heinz Bongartz (Summer 1944)
 Karl Maria Zwißler (1 January 1946 – 31 August 1947)
 Bernhard Conz (1 September 1947 – 31 July 1951)
 Karl Rucht (1 August 1951 – 31 July 1957)
 Otmar Suitner (1 September 1957 – 31 August 1960)
 Christoph Stepp (1 September 1960 – 31 August 1978)
 Christoph Eschenbach  (1 September 1978 – 31 August 1983)
 Leif Segerstam (1 September 1983 – 31 August 1990)
 Bernhard Klee (1 August 1992 – 31 July 1997)
 Theodor Guschlbauer (1 September 1997 – 31 July 2001)
  (1 September 2002 – 31 July 2009)
 Karl-Heinz Steffens (since 1 August 2009 – 2018)
 Michael Francis (2019 – present)

References

External links
Official site

German symphony orchestras
Ludwigshafen
Musical groups established in 1919
Organisations based in Rhineland-Palatinate
1919 establishments in Germany